Count Pyotr Semyonovich Saltykov (11 December 1697/1698/1700 – 26 December 1772) was a Russian statesman and a military officer, promoted to the rank of Field marshal on 18 August 1759.

Early life 
Saltykov was born in Russia in the village of Nikolskoye, southwest to the Lake Nero, the son of Semyon/Semjon Andreievich Saltykov (10 April 1672 - 1 October 1742), a landowner of an ancient Boyar family which rivalled the Romanovs in nobility and was descended from a sister of the first Romanov Tsar, and wife Fekla Jakowlevna Wolynskaya. He had a younger brother, Count Vladimir Semyonovich Saltykov (6 August 1705 - 5 January 1751). He was a distant cousin of Sergei Vasilievich Saltykov, first lover of Catherine the Great, and was also related to Praskovia Fyodorovna Saltykova.

Life 
The year of his birth is uncertain. It is estimated as between 1697 and 1700, as in 1714 he was sent by Peter the Great to France to master the science of navigation. He remained there for much of the twenty years that followed.

In 1729, Saltykov bought the estate of Marfino, and in 1731 he married Princess Praskovia Yuriyevna Trubetskaya (1704 - 1767), a daughter of Prince Yuri Yuriyevich Troubetzkoy by his first wife Princess Yelena Grigoriyevna Cherkasskaya, and on 19 January 1732 or 1733 his father was created a Count.

In 1759, during the Seven Years' War of 1756-1763, he was appointed commander-in-chief of the Russian army and would soon win a victory at Palzig (Battle of Kay) and Kunersdorf.

In 1763, Saltykov became commander-in-chief of Moscow and was put in charge of the Moscow Senate Office. During Saltykov's time in office, he established a number of new post offices, restored Golovinsky and Kolomensky Palaces, and a number of city gates. They also repaired most of the worn-out bridges across the Moscow River and continued dismantling the walls of the White City (fortification belt around Moscow) in order to provide building material for the construction of the Orphanage ordered by Catherine the Great and the restoration of the Arsenal. In April 1764, Saltykov reported to Saint Petersburg on the opening of the Moscow Orphanage. With the purpose of providing Muscovites with food, Saltykov banned the removal of imported bread from the city and arranged for wholesale purchases of bread from landowners. He also secured regular wine deliveries to Moscow, the need for which had been estimated at 575,000 vedros. Saltykov was also fighting against gambling.

In 1765, he took part in burning of books "harmful to the society" at the order of Catherine the Great. During the plague outbreak in 1771, which caused mass departure of landowners, city officials, and rich merchants from Moscow, Pyotr Saltykov asked Catherine the Great for permission to leave the city. Without waiting for her reply, he left for his Marfino estate on the outskirts of Moscow. After a plague riot had broken out in Moscow on 16 September, Saltykov returned to the city. However, Catherine the Great relieved him of his post on 13 November 1771. A year later, he died on his estate at Marfino.

Family
By his wife Princess Praskovia Yuriyevna Trubetskaya, Saltykov had: 
 Countess Anastasia Petrovna Saltykova (26 November 1731 - 24 March 1830), married Pjotr Kwaschnin-Samarin (? - 19 October 1815)
 Countess Warwara Petrovna Saltykova, married on 4 November 1754 as his first wife Prince Wassili Borisovich Galitzine (? - aft. 1793), later remarried, without issue from any of his marriages
 Count Ivan Petrovich Saltykov (29 June 1739 - 14 November 1805)
 Countess Ekaterina/Jekaterina Petrovna Saltykova (2 October 1743 - Rome, 13 October 1816), married in 1762 Count Andrey Petrovich Shuvalov (23 June 1743 - 24 April 1789), and had issue

References

External links 
  Biography
  Biography and references

1697 births
1772 deaths
Field marshals of Russia
Imperial Russian Army generals
Governors-General of Moscow
Politicians of the Russian Empire
Russian military personnel of the Seven Years' War
Russian nobility
People of the Silesian Wars
Recipients of the Order of the White Eagle (Poland)